Vasant Gajera, born on 25 May 1954, is an Indian businessman and philanthropist. He is the founder of Laxmi Diamond Group, a diamond manufacturing and exporting company.

Early life 
Gajera was born on 25 May 1954 to a farmer family in Amreli, Gujarat, India to the late Shri Haribhai Gajera and Shantaben Gajera. He left his home town and moved to Surat in 1968 at the age of 14. After studying diamond cutting and polishing for a few years in Surat, he started his business under the name of Laxmi Diamond in 1972.

Early career 
Gajera, born in Amreli and originally from Kathiawad, realized at a very young age that to earn out a living from the parched land for a farming community, especially in the absence of rainfall, is indeed an impossible and tall task. He left his home town and arrived in Surat where he worked in jewellery factory for two years. He left that job to try his hand at his own business in the diamond market.

Founding of Laxmi Diamond 
He started a small manufacturing unit in Surat, in 1972, doing job work, thus laying the foundation of the Laxmi Diamond Group. Shortly his younger brothers joined him and they expanded their operations, creating employment for more than 4000 people. Sir Gabi Tolkowsky was appointed as a training consultant to Laxmi Diamond manufacturing operations and worldwide spokesman for Gabrielle in the year 2005. The company imports rough diamonds, processes and exports polished diamonds to the US, Far East, Europe, the Middle East and South East Asia. Since 1995, Laxmi Diamond has been a sightholder of the Diamond Trading Company (DTC). Laxmi Diamond has also been honored with “Most Socially Responsible Company” by GJEPC-India.

Philanthropy and Gajera Trust 
Smt. Shantaben Haribhai Gajera Charitable Trust popularly known as Gajera Trust was established on 15 January 1993. It is the fully funded sustainable initiatives that do not accept donations and provide education for over 40000 children. The key moment of the Trust is to serve the nation and its people in general. The Trust mainly works in education, healthcare and community services. Gajera has a deep commitment towards a social cause, and spends a lot of his time and resources for various welfare and charitable activities which have blossomed into several charitable Institutions in the field of education, health, social welfare, etc

Education 
Education is a basic necessity for the overall development of society. Upliftment of the poor and needy, education for women and medical facilities are subjects very close to his heart. So various institutes are established. Gajera Vidyabhavan, Gajera Shaikshanik Sankul, Laxmi Vidyapeeth, Shantabaa Medical College etc. Trust has taken innovative steps for conducting classes amid covid-19 lockdown.

Healthcare 
Gajera initiated various health initiatives such as blood donation camps, mobile diagnostic vans, eye check-up camps etc. He supports the healthcare sector within rural regions toward upliftment, empowerment and timely intervention. Vasant Gajera established Shantabaa Medical College and General Hospital, Amreli under Gajera Trust, with a vision to achieve excellence in the field of Medical Education, Health Care and Research in the year 2017. It is under the Public-Private Partnership with the Government of Gujarat since June 2018. It is affiliated with Saurashtra University and is recognised by the Medical Council of India.

Vatsalyadham 
On his birthday he established Vatsalyadham - a home for the underprivileged children in Surat Gujarat, which was started with 56 children, today houses around 850 inmates, who live a comfortable and respectful life together. Apart from primary needs like Food, Clothing and Shelter, these children also get the best education.

Controversies 
Gajera, along with his brother, Chuni, was arrested on 22 March 2018 under allegations that he used forged documents to unlawfully usurp land. He was charged on 5 April 2018. The complaint dates back to 2003, with Gajera allegedly building a wall around the illegally acquired land. Initially, police failed to act upon the complaint, but after the complainant, Vajubhai Malani, contested the decision in the high court, the court ordered the police to charge Gajera.
The charges under the Indian penal code were the following counts:

 468 – forgery for the purpose of cheating
 471 – using as genuine forged documents
 120 (b) – criminal conspiracy
 341 – wrongful restraint
 447 – criminal trespass
 465 – forgery
 467 – forgery of valuable security

On 27 June 2018 Umra police successfully requested the cancellation of his bail, citing that Gajera was non-cooperative and is the prime suspect. A warrant for his arrest was issued the following day.

See also 
 Shantabaa Medical College, Amreli

References

External links 
 
 Gajera Trust
 Founder Chairman, Laxmi Diamond
 Shantabaa Medical College and General Hospital, Amreli
 Vasant Gajera and Vatsalyadham
"Religion no barrier at Vatsalyadham in Surat"

Living people
1954 births
People from Amreli district
Indian company founders
Diamond dealers
People charged with fraud
Gujarati people
Indian billionaires
Indian Hindus
Indian philanthropists
People from Surat
Businesspeople from Gujarat